Worblaufen railway station is a railway station in the municipality of Ittigen, in the Swiss canton of Bern. It is a keilbahnhof, located at the junction of three  gauge lines of Regionalverkehr Bern-Solothurn: Solothurn–Worblaufen, and Zollikofen–Bern .

Services 
The following services stop at Worblaufen:

 Bern S-Bahn:

References

External links 
 
 

Railway stations in the canton of Bern
Regionalverkehr Bern-Solothurn stations